Merel Hofman (born 4 January 1998) is a Dutch professional racing cyclist, who most recently rode for UCI Women's Continental Team .

References

External links

1998 births
Living people
Dutch female cyclists
Place of birth missing (living people)
People from Lansingerland
Cyclists from South Holland
20th-century Dutch women
21st-century Dutch women